Léonie Martin, also known as Sister Françoise-Thérèse, VHM (3 June 1863 – 16 June 1941) was a French Catholic nun who led a cloistered life as a member of the Visitation Sisters. She was the daughter of Saints Louis Martin and Marie-Azélie Guérin Martin and an elder sister of Saint Thérèse of Lisieux. She is sometimes dubbed Saint Thérèse's "difficult sister".

Her cause for beatification was permitted to be introduced in the Diocese of Bayeux and Lisieux in 2015, and she has been given the posthumous title Servant of God.

Life
Léonie Martin was born in Alençon in the department of Orne in France on 3 June 1863 to Louis Martin and Marie-Azélie Guérin Martin – both of whom were canonized on 18 October 2015 by Pope Francis. She had several siblings, who included Thérèse, the future saint. Among them were:

Marie Louise
Marie Pauline
Marie Hélène
Marie-Joseph-Louis
Marie-Joseph-Jean-Baptiste
Marie Céline
Marie-Mélanie-Thérèse
Marie-Françoise-Thérèse (future saint)

As a child, Léonie had fragile health; at eighteen months old, she almost died. She suffered from the whooping cough in addition to measles with strong convulsions and eczema. She was a restless child, who was seen as a burden on her mother, who suffered much to care for her – a difficult child. Because she was so disruptive at the Visitation convent school, she was asked to leave.

Her mother died on 28 August 1877, leaving the fourteen-year-old Léonie with her father and sisters. Louis Martin and his five daughters then moved to Lisieux to be near Zélie's brother, Isidore Guérin, and his wife. Léonie was a boarding pupil at the school run by the Benedictine nuns of the Abbey of Notre Dame du Pré in Lisieux, where Thérèse later studied.

In October 1882, Léonie's older sister, Pauline, entered the Carmelite Monastery at Lisieux. Three of her sisters later followed.

In October 1886, the Martin family visited Alençon so that their oldest daughter, Marie, could see the scenes of her childhood and say good-by to their friends there before she entered the Carmelite Monastery in Lisieux. While they were there, Léonie, then 23, unexpectedly entered the monastery of the Poor Clares, but, finding their austere rule too difficult, she remained there only six weeks. In the summer of 1887 she entered the Monastery of the Visitation at Caen, but returned to Lisieux only six months later. Soon after that, in April 1888, Thérèse, then 15, entered the Carmelite Monastery at Lisieux.

Léonie and Céline were left at home with their father, whose health was beginning to fail. In February 1889, suffering from hallucinations, he was interned in a psychiatric hospital at Caen where he remained for more than three years. For several months Léonie and Céline moved to Caen to be near him, but, as he was allowed only one visit a week, they returned to Lisieux, becoming part of the family of their uncle, Isidore Guérin, and made the weekly visits by train. While they were in Caen Léonie often visited the Monastery of the Visitation. In May 1892 Louis Martin returned to Lisieux, and Léonie and Céline took care of him in a small house on rue Labbey in Lisieux, across the way from their uncle's house. In 1893 Léonie made her second attempt at the Visitation at Caen. This time she received the habit, and remained there for more than two years, corresponding lovingly with her sisters. While she was living at the Visitation, her father died (on 29 July 1894). Soon after that Céline joined her sisters at the Carmel in Lisieux. After two years at the Visitation, Léonie found that her health did not allow her to stay. She returned to Lisieux, to her uncle Isidore's home, in the summer of 1895. To Léonie's two stays in the Visitation we owe the powerful letters she exchanged with her sister Thérèse, who led Léonie along the "way of confidence and love" she herself was discovering. In 1897 Thérèse died of tuberculosis. Her memoir, Story of a Soul, was published in 1898. Reading it gave Léonie new hope for her own religious vocation. She entered the Visitation at Caen definitively on 28 January 1899. On 2 July 1900 she at last became a professed member of the Visitation Sisters with the new name of "Françoise-Thérèse".

Léonie carried on a fervent correspondence with her sisters at the Lisieux Carmel. Her health continued to falter, and she lived in the shadow of ill health, besieged with ailments such as eczema. She died on 16 June 1941.

Beatification process
On January 24, 2015 her beatification process began in France with the declaration of "nihil obstat" (nothing against), thus conferring upon her the posthumous title of the Servant of God. This began the local diocesan process that gathered documentation and testimonies about Léonie's life and writings; the local process was opened in the chapel of the Visitandine convent at Caen on 2 July 2015. The first, diocesan, phase of the beatification process was closed on 22 February 2020.

Prayers are now being offered for her to be declared "Venerable", the next step on the road to beatification.

References

External links
Hagiography Circle
Visitation Sisters
"Léonie Martin, Disciple and Sister of Saint Thérèse of Lisieux"
"Léonie Martin, Soeur Françoise-Thérèse", a Web site in French maintained by the Monastery of the Visitation at Caen

1863 births
1941 deaths
19th-century venerated Christians
20th-century venerated Christians
French Servants of God
People from Alençon
19th-century French nuns
20th-century French nuns